The 2022 PDC Women's Series consists of 20 darts tournaments on the 2022 PDC Pro Tour.

Prize money
The prize money for the Women's Series events remained the same from 2021, with each event having a prize fund of £5,000.

This is how the prize money is divided:

March

Women's Series 1 
Women's Series 1 was contested on Saturday 12 March 2022 at the Barnsley Metrodome in Barnsley.

Women's Series 2 
Women's Series 2 was contested on Saturday 12 March 2022 at the Barnsley Metrodome in Barnsley.

Women's Series 3 
Women's Series 3 was contested on Sunday 13 March 2022 at the Barnsley Metrodome in Barnsley.

Women's Series 4 
Women's Series 4 was contested on Sunday 13 March 2022 at the Barnsley Metrodome in Barnsley.

April

Women's Series 5 
Women's Series 5 was contested on Saturday 30 April 2022 at the Robin Park Sports Centre in Wigan.

Women's Series 6 
Women's Series 6 was contested on Saturday 30 April 2022 at the Robin Park Sports Centre in Wigan.

May

Women's Series 7 
Women's Series 7 was contested on Sunday 1 May 2022 at the Robin Park Sports Centre in Wigan.

Women's Series 8 
Women's Series 8 was contested on Sunday 1 May 2022 at the Robin Park Sports Centre in Wigan.

June

Women's Series 9 
Women's Series 9 was contested on Saturday 25 June 2022 at the Barnsley Metrodome in Barnsley. The tournament was won by Lisa Ashton.

Women's Series 10 
Women's Series 10 was contested on Saturday 25 June 2022 at the Barnsley Metrodome in Barnsley. The tournament was won by Lorraine Winstanley.

Women's Series 11 
Women's Series 11 was contested on Sunday 26 June 2022 at the Barnsley Metrodome in Barnsley. The tournament was won by Fallon Sherrock.

Women's Series 12 
Women's Series 12 was contested on Sunday 26 June 2022 at the Barnsley Metrodome in Barnsley. The tournament was won by Lisa Ashton.

August

Women's Series 13 
Women's Series 13 was contested on Saturday 27 August 2022 at the Halle 39 in Hildesheim. The tournament was won by Beau Greaves.

Women's Series 14 
Women's Series 14 was contested on Saturday 27 August 2022 at the Halle 39 in Hildesheim. The tournament was won by Beau Greaves.

Women's Series 15 
Women's Series 15 was contested on Sunday 28 August 2022 at the Halle 39 in Hildesheim. The tournament was won by Beau Greaves.

Women's Series 16 
Women's Series 16 was contested on Sunday 28 August 2022 at the Halle 39 in Hildesheim. The tournament was won by Beau Greaves, who completed a clean sweep of the 4 events held that weekend.

October

Women's Series 17 
Women's Series 17 was contested on Saturday 29 October 2022 at the Robin Park Sports Centre in Wigan.

Women's Series 18 
Women's Series 18 was contested on Saturday 29 October 2022 at the Robin Park Sports Centre in Wigan.

Women's Series 19 
Women's Series 19 was contested on Sunday 30 October 2022 at the Robin Park Sports Centre in Wigan.

Women's Series 20 
Women's Series 20 was contested on Sunday 30 October 2022 at the Robin Park Sports Centre in Wigan. The tournament was won by Beau Greaves, who completed a clean sweep of the 4 events held that weekend. She also qualified for the 2023 PDC World Darts Championship, alongside Lisa Ashton.

References 

2022 in darts
2022 PDC Pro Tour